Mortal Wound is a 2021 Iranian neo-noir mystery drama and family series written and directed by Mohammad Hossein Mahdavian based on the 2017 Mahmoud Hosseini Zad novella Twenty Mortal Wounds, which is also based on William Shakespeare's play The Tragedy of Macbeth. The series includes 15 episodes, the first of which was released on Filimo on 4 June 2021.

The series is the most-watched home video series in Iran.

Plot 

Maleki is one of the managers of a successful company run by Rizabadi. Rizabadi instructs him to negotiate a major oil deal with the Norwegians. After signing the contract, the Norwegians want to transfer the contract amount, which is several million dollars to the company's account.

Cast

Reception

Critical response 
The series received critical acclaim for its screenplay, direction, and acting performances. It also recorded the highest average rating of 99% for a drama on filimo with its first three episodes.

Awards and nominations

References

External links 
 
 

2021 Iranian television series debuts
Works based on Macbeth